Bria may refer to :

Names
 Bria (name), various people

Places and jurisdictions
 Bria, Central African Republic, capital of Haute-Kotto
 Bria, Phrygia, ancient city and former bishopric in present Anatolia, now a Latin Catholic titular see.